Claw Boys Claw 3 in 1 (also known as Claw Boys Claw or as 3 in 1) is a compilation album  by the Dutch rock and roll band Claw Boys Claw. The album, released on LP by Polydor, combined songs from the Indian Wallpaper 12-inch single (1985), the "So Mean" single (1985), and the 12-inch single Now! (1984).

Track listing

Tracks 1, 4, and 5 from Indian Wallpaper; tracks 2 and 3 from "So Mean"; tracks 6-11 recorded live in the Melkweg, Amsterdam, November 29, 1984.

Personnel
John Cameron - guitar
Pete TeBos - vocals
Bobbie Rossini - bass
Marius Schrader - drums

References

See also
Claw Boys Claw discography

Claw Boys Claw albums
1987 compilation albums
Polydor Records compilation albums